Béla Frankl (23rd April 1896 – 11th June 1937), known by the name Máté Zalka, was a Hungarian writer, soldier, and revolutionary. He fought in the Royal Hungarian Army during the First World War and was captured by the Imperial Russian Army. Subsequently, while a Russian prisoner of war he came under the influence of Bolshevism and fought during the Russian Civil War. After participating in various other conflicts for the Soviet Union, Zalka moved to Spain and fought in the Spanish Civil War as a General for the International Brigades. He was killed June 22, 1937 near Huesca when his car was hit by artillery fire. His remains were brought back to Hungary where he was buried in the Kerepesi Cemetery in Budapest.

Biography

Early life
Máté Zalka, was born on April 23, 1896, to the name Béla Frankl. He was born into a family of Hungarian Jews living in Tunyogmatolcs, Austria-Hungary. He attended Polgári Iskola, a high school in Mátészalka, where he would later take his new name from.

Hungary in World War I
At the age of 18, Zalka lied about his age in order to volunteer in the Royal Hungarian Army. An Officer of Hussars, Zalka fought in Italy, which later became the subject of his novel Doberdó. He fought on the Russian front in 1917 where he was capture by the Imperial Russian Army and brought to a prisoner of war camp. Subsequently, he came under the influence of Bolshevism and fought during the Russian Civil War.

Russian Civil War
In February 1918, during the Russian Civil War, Zalka formed an international group of Red Guards in Khabarovsk which consisted mainly of 
former Hungarian prisoners and participated in the punitive action against the White formations in Siberia. At the end of World War I, Zalka chose to stay in Russia instead of returning to Hungary where he met his future wife Vera. They had one daughter, who later died due to complications from the Chernobyl Disaster.

GPU operational activities
In 1920, Zalka fought against Poland in the Battle of Kyiv. From 1921 to 1923, he was commander of a regiment of cavalry of the VCK GPU, the Soviet Communist Party Secret Service that fought in Crimea and Ukraine, and was involved in the elimination of forces of Nestor Makhno and other atamans of Ukraine. Because these atamans were widely supported by their local people, many of the actions resulted in punitive operations against civilians. At some point, he fought in the Turkish War of Independence under the assumed name of Lukács Tábornok (General Lukács).

While he was a prisoner of war camp, he organized the prisoners´ theatre. He was director of the "Theatre of Revolution" (now called "Mayakovsky Theatre") in Moscow (1925–1928).

Spanish Civil War
In 1936, Zalka moved to Spain. In November he joined the International Brigades to fight in the Spanish Civil War. Under the assumed name of Pál Lukács and with the rank of General, he initially commanded the XII International Brigade and later, the 45th Division. In 1937, he was killed near Huesca when his car was hit by artillery fire. Zalka is mentioned in a number of works of Hemingway.

His remains were originally buried in the south of Spain. However, decades after his death, Zalka's nephew (who also fought in the Spanish Civil war) was invited by the Spanish royal family to a ceremony celebrating the end of the civil war. At this point, he was able to carry Zalka's remains to Hungary where they were buried in the Kerepesi Cemetery in Budapest along with other high-ranking Hungarian military officers.

References 

1896 births
1937 deaths
Burials at Kerepesi Cemetery
20th-century Hungarian people
Hungarian soldiers
Jewish Hungarian writers
Jewish refugees
Jewish socialists
Hungarian Jews
Hungarian refugees
Hungarian people of the Spanish Civil War
Hungarian expatriates in Spain
People from Mátészalka
People from Szabolcs-Szatmár-Bereg County
Military personnel killed in the Spanish Civil War
International Brigades personnel
Soviet Jews in the military
Soviet people of the Spanish Civil War
Hungarian emigrants to the Soviet Union